The Plaza de toros La Montera is a bull ring in Los Barrios, a town in the province of Cádiz at the southern edge of Spain, close to the British territory of Gibraltar, was opened in 2000.

Named La Montera after the nearby rock formation that looks like a bullfighter's hat (Montera del torero in Spanish).

References

Bullrings in Spain